Kasprzycki (feminine Kasprzycka) is a Polish surname. Notable people include:

 Jacek Kasprzycki, Polish slalom canoeist
 Justyna Kasprzycka (born 1987), Polish athlete
 Mieczysław Kasprzycki (1910-2001), Polish ice hockey player
 Tadeusz Kasprzycki (1891-1978), Polish military officer
 Wincenty Kasprzycki (1802-1849), Polish painter

Polish-language surnames